Kunnathidavaka  is a village near Vythiri in Wayanad district in the state of Kerala, India.

Demographics
 India census, Achooranam had a population of 9754 with 4755 males and 4999 females.

Transportation
Kunnathidavakais 71 km by road from Kozhikode railway station and this road includes nine hairpin bends. The nearest major airport is at Calicut. The road to the east connects to Mysore and Bangalore. Night journey is allowed on this sector as it goes through Bandipur national forest. The nearest railway station is Mysore.  There are airports at Bangalore and Calicut.

References

Villages in Wayanad district
Kalpetta area